The Klamath Mountains are a rugged and lightly populated mountain range in northwestern California and southwestern Oregon in the western United States. As a mountain system within both the greater Pacific Coast Ranges and the California Coast Ranges, the Klamath Mountains have a varied geology, with substantial areas of serpentinite and marble, and a climate characterized by moderately cold winters with very heavy snowfall and warm, very dry summers with limited rainfall, especially in the south. As a consequence of the geology and soil types, the mountains harbor several endemic or near-endemic trees, forming one of the largest collections of conifers in the world. The mountains are also home to a diverse array of fish and animal species, including black bears, large cats, owls, eagles, and several species of Pacific salmon. Millions of acres in the mountains are managed by the United States Forest Service. The northernmost and largest sub-range of the Klamath Mountains are the Siskiyou Mountains.

Geography

Physiographically, the Klamath Mountains include the Siskiyou Mountains, the Marble Mountains, the Scott Mountains, the Trinity Mountains, the Trinity Alps, the Salmon Mountains, and the northern Yolla-Bolly Mountains. They are a section of the larger Pacific Border province, which in turn is part of the Pacific Mountain System (Pacific Coast Ranges) physiographic division.

Ten highest peaks
These are the ten highest points in the Klamath Mountains:
 1. Mount Eddy (Trinity County and Siskiyou County, California)
 2. Thompson Peak (Trinity and Siskiyou County, California)
 3. Mount Hilton (Trinity and Siskiyou County, California)
 4. Caesar Peak (Trinity and Siskiyou County, California)
 5. Sawtooth Mountain (Trinity County, California)
 6. Wedding Cake Mountain (Trinity County, California)
 7. Caribou Mountain (Siskiyou County, California)
 8. China Mountain (Siskiyou County, California)
 9. Gibson Peak (Trinity County, California)
 10. Boulder Peak (Siskiyou County, California)

Protected areas
A large portion of the Klamath Mountains is managed by the United States Forest Service. Several national forests lie in the Klamath Mountains region, including the Shasta-Trinity National Forest, Siskiyou National Forest, Klamath National Forest, Six Rivers National Forest, and Mendocino National Forest.

The Klamath Mountains contain 11 wilderness areas in both Oregon and California:

Chanchelulla Wilderness
Kalmiopsis Wilderness
Marble Mountain Wilderness
Mount Lassic Wilderness
North Fork Wilderness
Red Buttes Wilderness
Russian Wilderness
Siskiyou Wilderness
Soda Mountain Wilderness
Trinity Alps Wilderness
Yolla Bolly-Middle Eel Wilderness

Recreation
There are extensive hiking trail systems, recreation areas, and campgrounds both primitive and developed in the Klamaths. A  stretch of the Pacific Crest Trail (PCT) passes through these mountains as well. This section of the PCT is known locally as "The Big Bend" and is the transition from the California Floristic Province to the Cascades.

The Bigfoot Trail is a  trail through the Klamath Mountains from the Yolla Bolly-Middle Eel Wilderness to Crescent City, California.

Geology
Klamath Mountains is the name given to one of California's eleven geomorphic provinces.

The rocks of the Klamath Mountains originated as island arcs and continental fragments in the Pacific Ocean. The island masses consisted of rifted fragments of pre-existing continents and volcanic island masses created over subduction zones. These island masses contain rocks as old as 500 million years, dating to the early Paleozoic Era. A succession of eight island terranes moved eastward on the ancient Farallon plate and collided with the North American plate between 260 and about 130 million years ago. Each accretion left a terrane of rock of a single age. During the accretion, subduction of the plate metamorphosed the overlying rock and produced magma which intruded the overlying rock as plutons. Serpentinite, produced by the metamorphism of basaltic oceanic rocks, and intrusive rocks of gabbroic to granodiorite composition are common rocks within the Klamath terranes.

Subsequent lava flows from active volcanoes in the Cascade Range and the erosion of the Oregon Coast Range to the north partially covered these rocks with basalt and sediments.

Ecology

Flora

As a consequence of the geology, the mountains harbor rich biodiversity, with several distinct plant communities, including temperate rain forests, moist inland forests, oak forests and savannas, high elevation forests, and alpine grasslands. These communities form the Klamath Mountains ecoregion. One of the principal plant communities in the Klamath Mountains is Mediterranean California Lower Montane Black Oak-Conifer Forest.

The ecoregion includes several endemic or near-endemic species, such as Port Orford cedar or Lawson's cypress (Chamaecyparis lawsoniana), foxtail pine (Pinus balfouriana spp. balfouriana), and Brewer's spruce (Picea breweriana), forming one of the largest collections of different conifers in the world. The flowering plant Kalmiopsis leachiana, also endemic to the Klamaths, is limited to the Siskiyou sub-range in Oregon.

Conifers
A large concentration of diverse coniferous species of trees exists in these mountains. Thirty conifer species (or more, depending on where one delineates the region) inhabit the area, including two endemic species, the Brewer's spruce and the Port Orford cedar, making the Klamath Mountains one of the richest coniferous forest regions of the world in terms of concentrated species diversity. The region also has several edaphic plant communities, adapted to specific soil types, notably serpentine outcrops.

In 1969, Drs. John O. Sawyer and Dale Thornburgh discovered 17 species of conifers in  around Little Duck Lake and Sugar Creek in the Russian Wilderness. They called this diverse area the Miracle Mile. In 2013 Richard Moore identified an 18th species, western juniper, in the Sugar Creek canyon. This is now considered the richest assemblage of conifers per unit area in any temperate region on Earth.

Conifer species in the Klamath Mountains include coast Douglas-fir (Pseudotsuga menziesii ssp. menziesii), Port Orford cedar, ponderosa pine (Pinus ponderosa), sugar pine (Pinus lambertiana), mountain hemlock (Tsuga mertensiana), white fir (Abies concolor var. lowiana), red fir (A. magnifica var. shastensis), Brewer spruce, coast redwood (Sequoia sempervirens), western red cedar (Thuja Plicata), and Pacific yew (Taxus brevifolia).

Trinity Alps flora
Typical species of the Trinity Alps region include Douglas fir, ponderosa pine, red fir, white fir, black oak, canyon live oak, Pacific madrone, bigleaf maple, California Buckeye, incense cedar, and Jeffrey pine. California's northernmost stand of gray pine (Pinus sabiniana) is found here along the South Fork of the Salmon River.

Fauna

The vast forested wildlands, coupled with a low rate of human settlement in the rugged remote terrain, makes for excellent habitat for a number of species. Mammal species include mountain lions, black bears, bobcats, lynx, raccoons, martens, fishers, beavers, grey fox, red fox, northern flying squirrel, and plentiful deer. Bird species include golden eagles, bald eagles, pileated woodpecker, band-tailed pigeon, several hawks including goshawks, several large owl species including the spotted owl, plus an extensive variety of additional species both plant and animal.

The area used to be home to grizzly bears and gray wolves. A project to reintroduce Roosevelt elk began in 1985 in the western Marble Mountains, near Elk Creek. Over the next 10 years the number and placement of reintroduced animals was expanded, and now elk can be seen roaming throughout the Marble Mountain Wilderness, in the northern Siskiyou Mountains, and along the South Fork of the Salmon River.

Some of the most remote areas are prone to rumors of Bigfoot/Sasquatch sightings from time to time, and the legendary creature plays a part in the folk tales of the Native American populations.

Rivers and fish 

Major rivers and lakes in the Klamath Mountains include the Klamath River, Trinity River, Smith River, Salmon River, Rogue River, Scott River, upper Sacramento River and Castle Lake.

The many mountains, streams and rivers form a major spawning ground for several species of trout and salmon; yet recently, in the last 50 years, some of the fish stocks have fallen drastically, particularly salmon stocks. The ecoregion's rivers and streams are home to nine species of native salmonids. The depletions occur mainly because dams and clearcutting on the rugged slopes of the area contribute to large amounts of silt in the stream beds, which in turn interfere with spawning salmon, as they lay their eggs in exposed gravel beds. The notable fish species are king, kokanee, and silver salmon, brown, brook, and rainbow trout (including steelhead), and crappie, bluegill, catfish, and largemouth and smallmouth bass.

See also
List of mountain ranges of California
List of mountain ranges of Oregon
The Klamath Knot

References

Works cited

Benke, Arthur C., ed., and Cushing, Colbert E., ed.; Stanford, Jack A.; Gregory, Stanley V.; Hauer, Richard F.; Snyder, Eric B. (2005). Rivers of North America. Burlington, MA: Elsevier Academic Press. . .

External links

Rare and Endemic Conifers of Northwest California - California Native Plant Society
Status Review for Klamath Mountains Province Steelhead - NOAA report

 
Mountain ranges of Northern California
Mountain ranges of Oregon
Pacific Coast Ranges
Mountain ranges of Siskiyou County, California
Mountain ranges of Trinity County, California
Mountain ranges of Del Norte County, California
Mountain ranges of Humboldt County, California
Mountain ranges of Jackson County, Oregon
Landforms of Curry County, Oregon
Landforms of Josephine County, Oregon
North American Cordillera
Physiographic sections